EiPT is a chemical in the tryptamine family, and produces psychedelic and hallucinogenic effects.  It was probably first synthesized by Alexander Shulgin.

Chemistry

EiPT is short for N-ethyl-N-isopropyl-tryptamine.  The full chemical name of this structure is N-ethyl-N-[2-(1H-indol-3-yl)ethyl]propan-2-amine.  EiPT is a tryptamine, which all belong to a larger family of compounds known as indolethylamines.  EiPT is closely related to the compounds diethyltryptamine (DET) and DIPT.

Dosage

In his book TiHKAL, Alexander Shulgin lists a dosage for EiPT as being 24-40 mg taken orally.

Effects

Very little is known about the psychopharmacological properties of EiPT, but reports suggest it produces psychedelic effects that can last 4–6 hours.  According to Shulgin, this compound tends to produce nausea, dysphoria, and other unpleasant side-effects.  It also lacks the hallucinatory and visual properties usually associated with psychedelic drugs.

Dangers

There have been no reported deaths or hospitalizations from EiPT, but its safety profile is unknown.

Legality

EiPT is unscheduled and uncontrolled in the United States, but possession and sales of EiPT could be prosecuted under the Federal Analog Act because of its structural similarities to DET.

See also
 5-MeO-EiPT

External links
  EiPT entry from TiHKAL
 EiPT entry in TiHKAL • info

Psychedelic tryptamines
Designer drugs
Isopropylamino compounds